Aeromonas sanarellii is a Gram-negative, oxidase- and catalase-positive, non-spore-forming bacterium of the genus Aeromonas isolated from wounds of patients in a hospital in Taiwan.

References

External links
Type strain of Aeromonas sanarellii at BacDive -  the Bacterial Diversity Metadatabase

Aeromonadales
Bacteria described in 2010